Kuding or kuzding (pronounced ) is a particularly bitter-tasting Chinese infusion, which due to their similarities in appearance is derived from several plant species. The two most common plants used to make kuding are the wax tree species Ligustrum robustum and the holly species Ilex kaushue (synonym: Ilex kudingcha), the former being more commonly grown in Sichuan and Japan while the latter is most commonly grown and used in the rest of China. Tea produced from Ligustrum or many species of Ilex is caffeine-free, although not Ilex paraguariensis, the source of mate drank in South America.

Folk medicine 

The traditional Chinese medicinal properties associated with kuding (and many other plants) include its ability to disperse wind-heat, clear the head and the eyes, and resolve toxin, thus being used for common cold, rhinitis, itching eyes, red eyes, and headache. It is also said to calm fidgets and alleviate thirst, especially when one is suffering from a disease that causes fever or severe diarrhea. It transforms phlegm and alleviates coughing, thus used in treating bronchitis. Finally, it is said to invigorate digestion and improve mental focus and memory.

Some research may suggest that the herb, derived from either Ilex or Ligustrum, promotes blood circulation, lowers blood pressure, and lowers blood lipids, including cholesterol. It has the reputation of preventing deterioration of the heart and brain function and maintaining proper body weight. It has also been found that Kuding made from L. robustum has similar anti-oxidative effects to tea in addition to additional anti-inflammatory properties.

See also 
 Yerba mate or Ilex paraguariensis - A species of holly that also contains caffeine and is popularly used to make mate in Paraguay, Uruguay, Argentina and Brazil.
 Ilex guayusa - also known as "guayusa", is an Amazonian tree, native to the Ecuadorian Amazon Rainforest.
 Ilex vomitoria - "Yaupon Holly", a caffeine containing plant from North America.
 Green tea

References 

Chinese teas
Herbal tea
Traditional Chinese medicine
Ilex drinks